"Happy Without You" is a song by Norwegian recording artist Annie from her debut album, Anniemal (2004). Written and produced by Annie and Timo Kaukolampi, the song was released as the album's third single in July 2005.

Critical reception
"Happy Without You" received mixed reviews from pop music critics. In a review for Slant Magazine, Sal Cinquemani praised the song for its "mix of live drums and...synth-guitar solo". William B. Swygart of Stylus Magazine wrote that the song was not "particularly hooky or catchy".

Track listings
CD single
(ANNIEMIX #01CD; Released 2005)
"Happy Without You" (Riton vocal mix) – 4:44
"Happy Without You" (SebastiAn remix) – 5:10
"Happy Without You" (Riton instrumental) – 4:42

12" single
(ANNIEMIX #001; Released 2005)
"Happy Without You" (Riton vocal mix) – 4:44
"Happy Without You" (SebastiAn remix) – 5:10
"Happy Without You" (Riton instrumental) – 4:42

Digital download
(Released )
"Happy Without You" (Riton vocal mix) – 4:44
"Happy Without You" (SebastiAn remix) – 5:10
"Happy Without You" (Riton instrumental) – 4:42

Personnel
Credits adapted from the liner notes of Anniemal.

 Annie – lead vocals, production 
 Abdissa Assefa – percussion
 Timo Kaukolampi – production
 Tuomo Puranen – bass
 Yngve Sætre – mixing

References

External links
 

2004 songs
2005 singles
679 Artists singles
Annie (singer) songs
Songs written by Annie (singer)